Busch is an extinct town in Pike County, in the U.S. state of Missouri. The GNIS classifies it as a populated place.

A post office called Busch was in operation from 1886 until 1948. The community took its name from the Anheuser-Busch company which kept an ice warehouse near the site.

References

Anheuser-Busch
Ghost towns in Missouri
Former populated places in Pike County, Missouri